Pendle Hill is a Quaker study, retreat, and conference center located on a   campus in suburban Wallingford, Pennsylvania, near Philadelphia.  It was named for the hill in Lancashire, England, that the first Quaker preacher described as the site of his calling to ministry.
Founded in 1930, Pendle Hill offers programs open to people of all faiths. These programs include online/residential study programs, short-term courses and retreats, conference services, publications, leadership training, and a walk-in bookstore. The online/residential study program includes a curriculum of worship, work, study, and service where people typically enrol for four weeks of online study and four weeks of residential study.  Short-term courses of two to seven days are offered throughout the year on themes including introductory Quakerism, nonviolent change, sustainable living, arts and spirituality, and bodywork.

The campus includes lawns, buildings, worship spaces, a large organic garden, and a walking path lined with trees.

For many years Pendle Hill has offered public lecture series. In response to the terrorism of September 11, 2001, Pendle Hill had a series of lectures and workshops concerning peacemaking. Recent series have focused on nurturing individual and corporate spiritual life.

Publishing
Pendle Hill also serves as a publishing house, and one of its most visible programs is its pamphlet series, which produces six pamphlets a year.  Recent topics have included spiritual nurture, Quaker practice, and pacifism.  As of December 2018 there have been 454 such pamphlets, and many are classics in Quaker spirituality.  The Pendle Hill Bookstore is a useful resource for Friends looking for Quaker resources perhaps not easily found in their local community.

Directors

[Incomplete list]
Henry Theodore Hodgkin (1877-1933). Director 1928-1933.
John Hughes
Howard Brinton
Richard Gregg
Anna Cox Brinton & Howard Brinton
Dan Wilson, 1952-1970
Robert Scholz / Colin Bell, 1971-74
Edwin Sanders, 1974-1981 
Robert Lyon, 1981-86
Margery Walker, 1986-1991
Daniel Seeger, 1991-2000
Steve Baumgartner, 2000-2005
Ken and Katharine Jacobsen, 2005-2007
Lauri Perman, Director from May 2007. 
Jennifer Karsten, Director, 2011-2019  
Traci Hjelt Sullivan (interim) 2019-2020
Francisco Burgos 2020-present

References

External links 
Pendle Hill Quaker Center for Study and Contemplation

Google maps
Dodson, Shirley. 2011. Pendle Hill Timeline: 1915-2011. Philadelphia, PA: Friends Journal. 

Quakerism in Pennsylvania
Quaker organizations based in the United States